William Horace Schmidlapp, II (January 29, 1916 – June 27, 1987) was an investment banker and Broadway producer, and the fourth husband of actress Carole Landis.

He was born in Cincinnati, Ohio, the son of William Horace Schmidlapp, Sr. and Jean Allison Maxwell Schmidlapp. He was the youngest of four brothers. His grandfather, Jacob Godrey Schmidlapp, founded several breweries and earned a fortune that was passed down to his grandchildren. During his youth W. Horace Schmidlapp spent much of his time with his mother and grandmother in France.

Schmidlapp moved to New York City and was involved in the productions of the Broadway plays Boyd's Daughter, Return Engagement, Cabin in the Sky, Count Me In, Polonaise, and South Pacific.

On December 8, 1945 Schmidlapp married actress Carole Landis. They separated in 1947, but at the time of Landis’ July 5, 1948 death Schmidlapp claimed that no divorce papers had been served upon him, and he and his wife had spent Christmas together in France.

In 1958 Schmidlapp married Patricia Kennedy McClintock in Palm Beach, Florida and adopted her daughter Victoria. He resided in Palm Beach until his death on June 27, 1987.

External links

References

1916 births
1987 deaths
American male stage actors
American theatre managers and producers
20th-century American singers
20th-century American businesspeople